Northway Village (Upper Tanana: K'ehtthiign) was a census-designated place (CDP) in Southeast Fairbanks Census Area, Alaska, United States. It was merged with Northway CDP prior to the 2020 Census. The population was 98 at the 2010 census, down from 107 in 2000.

Geography

Demographics

Northway Village first appeared on the 1980 U.S. Census as a census-designated place (CDP). It had previously been a part of Northway-Nabesna and Northway in 1950 and 1960 (population 196 for both censuses).

As of the census of 2000, there were 107 people, 32 households, and 20 families residing in the CDP. There were 39 housing units at an average density of 14.8/sq mi (5.7/km2). The racial makeup of the CDP was 1.87% White, 89.72% Native American, 2.80% from other races, and 5.61% from two or more races. 5.61% of the population were Hispanic or Latino of any race.

There were 32 households, out of which 50.0% had children under the age of 18 living with them, 31.3% were married couples living together, 25.0% had a female householder with no husband present, and 34.4% were non-families. 31.3% of all households were made up of individuals, and 12.5% had someone living alone who was 65 years of age or older. The average household size was 3.34 and the average family size was 4.19.

In the CDP, the age distribution of the population shows 32.7% under the age of 18, 14.0% from 18 to 24, 21.5% from 25 to 44, 24.3% from 45 to 64, and 7.5% who were 65 years of age or older. The median age was 27 years. For every 100 females, there were 91.1 males. For every 100 females age 18 and over, there were 118.2 males.

The median income for a household in the CDP was $24,688, and the median income for a family was $26,875. Males had a median income of $27,188 versus $22,500 for females. The per capita income for the CDP was $10,300. There were 9.1% of families and 25.0% of the population living below the poverty line, including 28.6% of under eighteens and none of those over 64.

References

Tanana Athabaskans
Census-designated places in Alaska
Census-designated places in Southeast Fairbanks Census Area, Alaska
Census-designated places in Unorganized Borough, Alaska